Group D of the 2019 Africa Cup of Nations took place from 23 June to 1 July 2019. The group consisted of Ivory Coast, Morocco, Namibia and South Africa.

Morocco and Ivory Coast as the top two teams, along with South Africa as one of the four best third-placed teams, advanced to the round of 16.

Teams

Notes

Standings

In the round of 16:
 The winners of Group D, Morocco, advanced to play the third-placed team of Group F, Benin.
 The runners-up of Group D, Ivory Coast, advanced to play the winners of Group E, Mali.
 The third-placed team of Group D, South Africa, advanced to play the winners of Group A, Egypt.

Matches

Morocco vs Namibia

Ivory Coast vs South Africa

Morocco vs Ivory Coast

South Africa vs Namibia

South Africa vs Morocco

Namibia vs Ivory Coast

References

External links
 

2019 Africa Cup of Nations